Lakeview is a station along the West Hempstead Branch of the Long Island Rail Road. It is located on the southeast corner of Eagle Avenue & Woodfield Road in West Hempstead, New York, and exists as little more than a high-level sheltered platform.  Hempstead Lake State Park is nearby. The former Southern Hempstead Branch crossed the line north of this station.

History
One of the newest stations on the West Hempstead Branch, Lakeview Station was built in 1924 as "Lake View," and was electrified two years later. At some point, the name of the station was changed to "Lakeview." Throughout most of its history, the station has been little more than an open shelter on a platform along the tracks between Woodfield Road and Eagle Avenue. High-level platforms were added during the 1990s.

Station layout
This station has one four-car-long side platform on the west side of the single track.

References

External links

Unofficial LIRR History Website
Across the tracks
Towards New York City
Towards West Hempstead
 Station from Eagle Avenue from Google Maps Street View
 Station from Woodfield Road from Google Maps Street View
Platform from Google Maps Street View

Long Island Rail Road stations in Nassau County, New York
1924 establishments in New York (state)
Railway stations in the United States opened in 1924